The Parti Ecologiste du Mali (Ecologist Party of Mali),  is a green party in Mali.

See also 

Conservation movement
Environmental movement
Green party
Green politics
List of environmental organizations
Sustainability
Sustainable development

References
 Research on the Green movement in Mali (in French)

Green parties in Africa
Political parties in Mali
Global Greens member parties